Crenicichla jegui is a species of cichlid native to South America. It is found in the Amazon River basin and in the lower Tocantins River basin.

The fish is named in honor of ichthyologist Michael Jégu from ORSTOM (Office de la Recherche Scientifique et Technique d’Outre-Mer), who collected the paratypes and most of the other specimens on which Ploeg’s paper is based upon.

References

jegui
Fish of the Amazon basin
Taxa named by Alex Ploeg
Fish described in 1986